Ioannis Symbonis (born 6 January 1935) is a Greek rower. He competed in two events at the 1960 Summer Olympics.

References

External links
 

1935 births
Living people
Greek male rowers
Olympic rowers of Greece
Rowers at the 1960 Summer Olympics
Sportspeople from Tripoli, Greece